Vikramjeet Virk is an Indian actor who has worked in Telugu, Malayalam, Hindi and Punjabi Language films.

Early life
Vikramjeet was born on 19 July 1984 to Sukhwant Singh Virk and Harjinder Kaur Virk in Tharwa Majra village, Karnal district, Haryana. He belongs to a Punjabi Sikh family of farmers. Virk did his schooling from Khalsa Sen Sec School and S.D. Sen Sec School in Karnal. As an athlete, he played kabaddi representing the state and had also played basketball and volleyball.

Career
Virk moved to Delhi in 2003 to pursue his Graduation from Delhi University and it was at this time he started his modelling career. He took his first step in the world of fashion on 19 July 2003, according to Virk's Official Website. His first assignment was "Lakme India Fashion Week". He went on to do many projects with noted fashion photographers as well as some music videos. Virk who is a devout Sikh says that to choose to model as his career was a tough one as it meant he would have to cut his hair which is against to religious beliefs of Sikhs and also because his parents were against it. He said:

Virk described his modelling career as follows:

Virk got his first Bollywood break when he bagged his first assignment with renowned director, Ashutosh Gowarikar's Khelein Hum Jee Jaan Sey, a movie based on the historical Chittagong Revolt set in the era of Indian Freedom Struggle. Virk played a negative role of a British police officer named Inspector Assanullah Khan. He was then roped in for a Malayalam movie opposite veteran actor Mohanlal in Casanovva, directed by Roshan Andrews. He played the lead antagonist named Alexi in this movie. The film was released in January 2012. Virk was applauded for his performance in the film especially for his action sequences.

According to Virk, during the shoot of Casanova in Dubai, he got a random call from producers who were planning a historical show for Zee Tv. He was cast in the role of Mahmud of Ghazni in Shobha Somnath Ki, 2011. Virk's portrayal was widely applauded and received his first award for his performance in the series and bagged the Best Actor in Negative Role (Best Khalnayak) Award of 2011 in Zee Rishtey Awards. He also did three more TV shows as Kaalkey in Jai Jag Janani Maa Durga, (2012); Banasura in Devon Ke Dev...Mahadev (2014) and Triloki in Maharakshak Aryan (2014).

Virk then went on to do two projects in Tollywood, Heart Attack and Bhimavaram Bullodu, where he played the characters Makarand Kamatti and Vikram respectively. He has been cast into two other Telugu films, Rudhramadevi as King Mahadeva Nayakudu and Sher as Pappi. During an interview with The Indian Express Virk was asked about his choice of roles; he remarked: 

He is an Optimum Nutrition sponsored athlete.

Filmography

Television And Web Series

References

External links
 About chinese film debut
 Vikramjeet Virk lands into Hollywood
 Haryanvi's are seedhi baat no bakwaas
 Vikramjeet in a happy space
 Tellychakkar.com gets up close and personal with Vikramjeet Virk
 

1984 births
Living people
Punjabi people
Indian Sikhs
Indian male film actors
Indian male television actors
21st-century Indian male actors
People from Karnal
Indian male models
Male actors from Haryana
Male actors in Telugu cinema
Male actors in Hindi cinema